The Houston Roughnecks are a professional American football team based in Houston, Texas. The team is an owned-and-operated member of the XFL. The Roughnecks plays their home games at TDECU Stadium.

History

McMahon Era (2020) 
On December 5, 2018, Houston was announced as one of eight cities that would join the newly reformed XFL, as well as  Seattle, St. Louis, Los Angeles, New York, DC, Tampa Bay, and Dallas. On May 13, 2019, June Jones left his position with the Hamilton Tiger-Cats to become Houston's head coach. The XFL confirmed the hire May 20.

On October 15, 2019, the Roughnecks announced their first player in team history, being assigned former Temple Owls Quarterback  P. J. Walker.

On February 8, 2020, the Roughnecks defeated the Los Angeles Wildcats in the second game in league history by a score of 37-17. The XFL announced that the remainder of the 2020 XFL season had been canceled due to the COVID-19 pandemic. The team finished with an undefeated regular season 5-0 record. On April 10, 2020, the XFL suspended operations, with all employees, players, and staff being terminated.

Dwayne Johnson and Dany Garcia Era (2023-present) 
On August 3, 2020, it was reported that a consortium led by Dwayne "The Rock" Johnson, Dany Garcia, and Gerry Cardinale (through Cardinale's fund RedBird Capital Partners) purchased the XFL for $15 million just hours before an auction could take place; the purchase received court approval on August 7, 2020. The XFL hired Wade Phillips as a head coach on April 13, 2022, with the expectation that he would be coaching the Houston team. On July 24, 2022, the return of a Houston XFL franchise was confirmed, as well as the hiring of Wade Phillips. On October 31, 2022, the XFL officially announced that the Roughnecks name would be returning, with a new logo.

Market overview 
Houston has previously hosted several other alternative professional football teams, including the Texans of the World Football League (unrelated to the current NFL team of the same name), Gamblers (2022) of the United States Football League (2022), and Thunderbears of the Arena Football League. Houston has one major league winter sport against which the XFL economically competes, the NBA Houston Rockets. The team will also have to compete with other Houston-based professional sports teams in the spring. The MLS Houston Dynamo, the NWSL Houston Dash, the MLR Houston SaberCats, and the USFL Houston Gamblers (2022) in March and April as well as the beginning of the MLB Houston Astros season.  The Roughnecks are also the second professional football team located in Houston, along with the NFL 
Houston Texans.

The Roughnecks are in-state rivals with the Arlington Renegades. Games between the two are marketed as the Texas Throwdown. Another in-state rival was added in 2023 with the addition of the San Antonio Brahmas to the XFL.

Logo change 
 On January 8, 2021, it was revealed that the NFL filed an opposition against the XFL’s trademark application for the Houston Roughnecks logo on December 28, 2020, claiming that the logo was too similar to the Houston Oilers logo. It was then later revealed that the NFL filed another trademark opposition to the Roughneck's secondary logo on behalf of the New England Patriots, claiming that the secondary logo was too similar to the Patriots' current logo. On April 7, 2021, it was revealed that the two logos were abandoned "with prejudice" which means that new applications for the logos could not be made.

The Roughnecks revealed their new logo on October 31, 2022, which is similar in shape to the previous derrick logo but with greater emphasis on the H (stylized to appear as if constructed from steel girders) and the star portion lowered so that the logo no longer explicitly resembles a derrick.

Staff

Players

Current roster

Player and staff history

Head Coach History

Offensive Coordinator History

Defensive Coordinator History

Former Notable Players 
 Connor Cook - Former Oakland Raiders Quarterback, 2016 4th Round Pick
 Kony Ealy - Former Carolina Panthers Defensive Tackle, 2014 2nd Round Pick
 DeMarquis Gates - Current Chicago Bears Linebacker
 Cam Phillips - 2020 XFL Receiving Yards Leader
 P. J. Walker - Current Carolina Panthers Quarterback, 2020 XFL Passing Yards, and Touchdowns Leader

Current Notable Players 

Cole McDonald - Former Hawaii Rainbow Warriors Quarterback, 2020 7th Round Pick

References

External links